Borek is a municipality and village in Prague-East District in the Central Bohemian Region of the Czech Republic. It has about 300 inhabitants.

History
The first written mention of Borek is from 1339.

Transport
Road II/331 goes through the municipality.

In the municipal territory there is a small airport used for sport flying.

References

Villages in Prague-East District